Battlespace or battle-space is a term used to signify a military strategy which integrates multiple armed forces for the military theatre of operations, including air, information, land, sea, cyber and outer space to achieve military goals.  It includes the environment, factors, and conditions that must be understood to successfully apply combat power, protect the force, or complete the mission. This includes enemy and friendly armed forces, infrastructure, weather, terrain, and the electromagnetic spectrum within the operational areas and areas of interest.

Concept

From "battlefield" to "battle-space" 
Over the last 25 years, the understanding of the military operational environment has transformed from primarily a time and space-driven linear understanding (a "battlefield") to a multi-dimensional system of systems understanding (a battle-space). This system of systems understanding implies that managing the battle-space has become more complex, primarily because of the increased importance of the cognitive domain, a direct result of the information age. Today, militaries are expected to understand the effects of their actions on the operational environment as a whole, and not just in the military domain of their operational environment.

From "Old" to "New" Battlespace 
As competition and conflict evolved during the industrial age, so has the ability to militarily compete in the information age. Thinking and fighting in the industrial age could best be conceptualized as the "Old Battlespace" because battlefield lines were more distinct and pronounced in the more tangible domains of land, sea, and air. However, as economies and technologies change, so do the ways countries and militaries compete and conduct warfare. Hence, in the information age, the tangible domains (land, sea, and air) remain a constant, however, with the advent of (and prominence) of cyber, outer-space, civil society, and social media (human or cognitive domain), such intangible realms of competition and conflict have taken on greater prominence in the way non-kinetic and kinetic forms of warfare are pursued. Such a "New Battlespace" means that traditional barriers (e.g. vast distances, oceans, laws, etc.,) that used to prevent targeting are no longer an obstacle. Thus, emergent domains enable everything to be weaponized and the globe becomes a competitive space for any state or non-state actor. Anything and everything will be weaponized, as everyone becomes a combatant in global contestation whether they like it or not. Such changes do not mean the nature of war has changed between Old and New Battlespaces, but instead points to the continuously changing character of war due to the modifications of economies, technologies, and military adaptation. This means the "New Battlespace" presents more complex problems to strategists and policymakers as the internet, deep interdependencies, and hyper-connectivity, make it difficult for armies built around an industrial age mindset to compete, and even more difficult when it comes to defending one's Homeland.

Battle-space agility
Battle-space agility refers to the speed at which the war-fighting organization develops and transforms knowledge into actions for desired effects in the battle-space. Essentially it argues that you must be better than the opposition at doing the right actions at the right time and place. Inbuilt into this understanding is that battle-space agility is not just about speed, but it is also about executing the most effective action (ways) in the most efficient manner (means) relative to achieving the desired impact on the system (ends). At all times battle-space agility is dependent on the quality of situational awareness and holistic understanding of the battle-space to  determine the best actions,  a logic that has become a driving force behind a renaissance of interest in the quality of military intelligence. It has been heavily linked to the ability of intelligence analysts and operational planners to understand their battle-space,  and their targets, as networks in order to facilitate a faster, and more accurate shared situational understanding. This in turn increases targeting efficacy and helps retain the overall initiative. Battle-space agility  has its roots solidly in the more generic Command & Control (C2) research field on C2 agility conducted by NATO, but works specifically with an agility concept within the context of war-fighting only. Hence it is framed by effects based thinking, system of systems analysis, and competing Observation Orient Decide Act (OODA) loops.

Battle-space awareness
Battle-space awareness (BA) is a practice of military philosophy that is used as a valuable asset by joint component and force commanders, to predict courses of action before employing troops into a prescribed area of operation (AO).  It utilizes the intelligence preparation asset to assist the commander in being 'aware' of recent, current, and near term events in their battle-space.

It is based around its knowledge and understanding obtained by the intelligence, surveillance, and reconnaissance (ISR) system.  It is another methodical concept used to gain information about the operational area—the environment, factors, and conditions, including the status of friendly and adversary forces, neutrals and noncombatants, weather and terrain—that enables timely, relevant, comprehensive and accurate assessments.  It has become an effective concept for conventional and unconventional operations in successfully projecting, or protecting, a military force, and/or completing its mission.

Battle-space digitization
Battle-space digitization is designed to improve military operational effectiveness by integrating weapons platforms, sensor networks, ubiquitous command and control (UC2), intelligence, and network-centric warfare. This military doctrine reflects that in the future, military operations will be merged into joint operations rather than take place in separate battle-spaces under the domain of individual armed services.

Battlespace intelligence preparation

Intelligence preparation
Intelligence preparation of the battlespace (IPB) is an analytical methodology employed to reduce uncertainties concerning the enemy, environment, and terrain for all types of operations. Intelligence preparation of the battle-space builds an extensive database for each potential area in which a unit may be required to operate.

The database is then analyzed in detail to determine the impact of the enemy, environment and terrain on operations and presents it in graphic form. Intelligence preparation of the battle-space is a continuing and crucial process to successful warfare.

Joint intelligence preparation
Joint intelligence preparation of the battle-space (JIPB) is the analytical process used by joint intelligence organizations to produce intelligence assessments, estimates and other intelligence products in support of the joint force commander's decision-making process. It is a continuous process that includes defining the total battle-space environment; describing the battle-space's effects; evaluating the adversary; and determining and describing adversary potential courses of action.

The process is used to analyze the aerial, terrestrial, maritime/littoral, spatial, electromagnetic, cyberspace, and human dimensions of the environment and to determine an opponent's capabilities to operate in each. JPIB products are used by the joint force and component command staffs in preparing their estimates and are also applied during the analysis and selection of friendly courses of action.

Battle-space measures

Maneuver control
Maneuver  control measures are the basic preliminary step in effective clearance of fire support (e.g. artillery, naval gunfire support, and close air support), marked by imaginary boundary lines used by commanders to designate the geographical area for which a particular unit is tactically responsible.  It is usually established on identifiable terrain to help aid in hasty referencing for better lateral advantage in the science of fire support, normally orchestrated by a  higher echelon of the general staff, mainly the operations staff sections.

They are normally designated along terrain features easily recognizable on the ground.  An important point on maneuver control graphics: staffs must be knowledgeable regarding the different maneuver control measures and their impact on clearance of fires. For instance, boundaries are both restrictive and permissive; corridors are restrictive, while routes, axis, and directions of attack are neither.

It should be reminded of the effect on clearance of fires if subordinate maneuver units are not given zones or sectors (i.e. no boundaries established).  Since boundaries serve as both permissive and restrictive measures, the decision not to employ them has profound effects upon timely clearance of fires at the lowest possible level.

The higher echelon may coordinate all clearance of fires short of the Coordinated Fire Line (CFL), a very time-intensive process.  It allows the unit to maneuver successfully and to swiftly and efficiently engage targets.  It requires coordination and clearance only within that organization.

They affect fire support in two ways:

 Restrictive—Restrictive control that is established in conjunction with a host nation to preclude damage or destruction to a national asset, population center, or religious structure.  Its key role is the protection of an element of tactical importance, such as a fuel storage area.
Restrictive fire area (RFA) is an area with specific restrictions and in which fires that exceed those restrictions will not be delivered without coordination with the establishing headquarters, or higher echelon; occasionally, it may be established to operate independently.
No-fire area (NFA) is a designated area which no fire support may be delivered for fires or effects.  When the establishing headquarters allows fires on a mission-by-mission basis.  When a friendly force is engaged by an enemy located within the NFA and the commander returns fire to defend their forces, the amount of return fire should not exceed that sufficient to protect the force and continue the mission.
 Permissive—Permissive control that gives the maneuver commander the liberty to announce and engage fire support at their will, unless it otherwise is restricted by a higher echelon.  Most cases, a commander will deny the use of Fire Support Coordinating Measures (FSCM).
There are free-fire areas (FFA) which fire support can commence without additional coordination with the establishing headquarters. Normally, it is established on identifiable terrain by division or higher headquarters.

Battle-space shaping

Battle-space shaping is a concept involved in the practice of maneuver warfare that are used for shaping a situation on the battlefield, gaining the military advantage for the commander.  It forecasts the elimination of the enemy's capability by fighting in a coherent manner before deploying determine-sized forces.

See also

 List of command and control abbreviations
 Command and control
 Fog of war
 Network-centric warfare
 Psychological warfare

References

Further reading
 Blackmore, T. (2005). War X: Human Extensions in Battle-space. University of Toronto Press. 
 Galeotti, M. (2022). The Weaponisation of Everything: A Field Guide to the New Way of War. Yale University Press. 
 Matisek, J. and Jayamaha, B. (2022). Old and New Battlespaces: Society, Military Power, and War. Lynne Rienner. 
 Mitchell, W. (2013). Battle-space Agility 101. Royal Danish Defense College Publishing House. 
 Mitchell, W. (2013). Battle-space Agility 201.Royal Danish Defense College Publishing House. 
 Mitchell, W. (2012). Battle-space Intelligence. Royal Danish Defense College Publishing House. 
 Mitchell, W. (2012). Battle-space Agility in Helmand. Royal Danish Defense College Publishing House. 
 Mitchell, W. (2008). Comprehensive Approach Capacity Building.Royal Danish Defense College Publishing House. 
 Owens, W. (2002). Dominant Battle-space Knowledge. University Press of the Pacific.

External links

 Marine Corps Doctrinal Publication (MCDP) 1-0: Marine Corps Operations'
 Achieving Dominant Battlespace Awareness
 Joint Synthetic Battlespace: Cornerstone for Predictive Battlespace Awareness
 Battlespace Digitization - Coping With Uncertainty In The Command Process
 Challenges for Joint Battlespace Digitization (JBD)

Command and control
Military strategy
Military terminology